Stenothyra is a genus of freshwater snails which have a gill and an operculum, aquatic gastropod mollusks in the family Stenothyridae.

Stenothyra is the type genus of the family Stenothyridae.

Distribution 
The distribution of Stenothyra includes China and Malaysia.

Species
Species within the genus Stenothyra include:

 Stenothyra acuta Brandt, 1974
 Stenothyra annandalei Brandt, 1968
 Stenothyra arabica Neubert, 1998
 Stenothyra australis Hedley, 1901
 Stenothyra basiangulata (Mori, 1938)
 Stenothyra basisculpta Brandt, 1970
  † Stenothyra bellardii (Dollfus & Dautzenberg, 1886)
 Stenothyra cambodiensis Brandt, 1971
 Stenothyra confinis Brandt, 1974 
 Stenothyra crooki Brandt, 1968
 Stenothyra cyrtochila van Benthem Jutting, 1959
 Stenothyra deltae (Benson, 1837)
 Stenothyra divalis (Gould, 1859)
 Stenothyra edogawensis (Yokoyama, 1927)
 Stenothyra fasciataBrandt, 1968 
 Stenothyra filipino S.-I Huang, M.-H. Lin, 2022
 Stenothyra gelasinosa Golding, 2014
 Stenothyra glabrata (A. Adams, 1851)
 Stenothyra hardouini de Morgan, 1885
 Stenothyra hokkaidonis Kuroda, 1962
 Stenothyra huaimoi ..., 1979
 Stenothyra hunanensis Moellendorff, 1888 
 Stenothyra hybocystoides Bavay, 1895
 Stenothyra japonicaKuroda, 1962 
 Stenothyra jinghongensis Davis, Guo & Hoagland, 1986
 Stenothyra jiraponi Brandt, 1968
 Stenothyra khongi ..., 1979
 Stenothyra koratensis Brandt, 1968
 Stenothyra krungtepensis Brandt, 1968
 Stenothyra labiata Brandt, 1968
 Stenothyra maculata Brandt, 1974
 Stenothyra mandahlbarthi Brandt, 1968
 Stenothyra mcmulleni Brandt, 1970 
 Stenothyra messageri
 Stenothyra microsculpta Brandt, 1974
 Stenothyra minima (G. B. Sowerby I, 1837)
 Stenothyra monilifera (Benson, 1856)
 Stenothyra moussoni Martens, 1897
 Stenothyra nana Prashad, 1921
 Stenothyra ovalis Brandt, 1970
 Stenothyra paludicola van Benthem Jutting, 1963
 Stenothyra polita (A. Adams, 1851)
 Stenothyra prasongi Brandt, 1974
 Stenothyra recondita Lindholm, 1929
 Stenothyra roseni Brandt, 1968
 Stenothyra saccata van Benthem Jutting, 1963
 Stenothyra schlickumi Brandt, 1968
 Stenothyra schuetti Brandt, 1968
 Stenothyra spinosa Brandt, 1974
 Stenothyra spiralis Brandt, 1968
 Stenothyra thermaecola Kuroda, 1962
 Stenothyra wykoffi

Species brought into synonymy
 Stenothyra nebularum van Benthem Jutting, 1963: synonym of Stenothyra australis Hedley, 1901
 Stenothyra quadrasi Möllendorff, 1895: synonym of Stenothyra polita (A. Adams, 1851)
Nomen dubium
 Stenothyra frustillum Benson, 1856

References

 Brandt R.A.M. (1974). The non-marine aquatic Mollusca of Thailand. Archiv für Molluskenkunde. 105: i-iv, 1-423.

External links 
 specimens of Stenothyra in the collection of Malacology Collection at the Academy of Natural Sciences, Philadelphia

Stenothyridae
Taxa named by William Henry Benson